Carposina nigronotata is a moth of the family Carposinidae. It was first described by Lord Walsingham in 1907. It is endemic to the Hawaiian islands of Maui and Hawaii.

The larvae feed in fruit and seeds of Myrsine lessertiana.

References

External links
New island record of Carposina nigronotata Walsingham on Maui (Lepidoptera: Carposinidae)

Carposinidae
Endemic moths of Hawaii
Moths described in 1907
Taxa named by Thomas de Grey, 6th Baron Walsingham